The UWA World Welterweight Championship is a championship in professional wrestling that is primarily contested for in various Lucha Libre promotions in Mexico. In 1993, the championship was recognized by the Japanese professional wrestling promotion Michinoku Pro, following Super Delfin's victory over then champion Celestial. In 1995, Gran Hamada was stripped of the championship, because he exceeded the weight limit. The championship returned to being primarily contested for in Mexico, and it wasn't until Taiji Ishimori's victory over Super Crazy in 2003 that a Japanese wrestler would hold the championship again.

As it was a professional wrestling championship, the championship was not won not by actual competition, but by a scripted ending to a match determined by the bookers and match makers. On occasion the promotion declares a championship vacant, which means there is no champion at that point in time. This can either be due to a storyline, or real life issues such as a champion suffering an injury being unable to defend the championship, or leaving the company.

Title history

Footnotes

References

Universal Wrestling Association championships
Welterweight wrestling championships
Toryumon championships
Michinoku Pro Wrestling championships
World professional wrestling championships